Sahe or SAHE may refer to:

Places
Sahé, Benin
Sahe, Cameroon, the location of Nkondjock Hôpital de District; see list of hospitals in Cameroon#Littoral 
Sohu, Iran, also spelled Sahe
Sahe, a settlement in Ndiass rural community, Senegal

Other
Sahe language, an Austronesian language of Papua New Guinea
Caviahue Airport, Argentina (former ICAO code: SAHE)
, the tail code of the Saeki Naval Air Group of the Imperial Japanese Navy; see List of air groups of the Imperial Japanese Navy

See also
Sri Siddhartha Academy of Higher Education (SSAHE)